Lebanon competed in the Summer Olympic Games for the first time at the 1948 Summer Olympics in London, England. Eight competitors, all men, took part in nine events in three sports.

Boxing

Shooting

Two shooters represented Lebanon in 1948.

25 metre pistol
 Khalil Hilmi

50 metre pistol
 Khalil Hilmi

50 metre rifle
 Salem Salam

Wrestling

References

External links
Official Olympic Reports

Nations at the 1948 Summer Olympics
1948 Summer Olympics
1948 in Lebanese sport